William Ryan Kelly (born October 30, 1987) is an American former professional baseball pitcher who played in Major League Baseball (MLB) for the Atlanta Braves in 2015.

Career

Early career
Kelly attended Hilton Head High School in Hilton Head, South Carolina, and Walters State Community College in Morristown, Tennessee. The Pittsburgh Pirates selected Kelly in the 26th round of the 2006 Major League Baseball Draft.

During the 2010–11 offseason, the Pirates traded Kelly to the Oakland Athletics for Corey Wimberly, and then the Athletics traded him to the Texas Rangers for Guillermo Moscoso. After the 2011 season, the Rangers traded Kelly to the San Diego Padres for Luis Martinez.
For the next two seasons, Kelly pitched in relief with the Texas League Champion AA San Antonio Missions and AAA Tucson Padres.

Atlanta Braves
Kelly signed as a free agent with the Braves in November 2013. He was promoted to the major leagues on June 28, 2015. He made his major league debut on June 30 against the Washington Nationals, pitching one inning, in which he gave up one run on two hits, while recording a strikeout and a walk. He was released on March 5, 2016.

Later career
After his release from the Braves, Kelly signed with the Uni-President 7-Eleven Lions of the Chinese Professional Baseball League. On July 15, 2016, Kelly signed with the Vaqueros Laguna of the Mexican Baseball League. Gaining a release on August 11, 2016, he signed on to play in the winter off-season Mexican Pacific League with the Yaquis de Obregon.

On April 6, 2017, Kelly signed with the Somerset Patriots of the Atlantic League of Professional Baseball. On May 17, 2017, Kelly signed a minor league deal with the Seattle Mariners. He pitched in relief at both AAA & AA levels finishing the season with 2.97 ERA, 32 Ks in 30.1 IP, .86 WHIP with 6 saves. He elected free agency on November 6, 2017.

Kelly continued putting up good numbers in 2017 when he signed on for the off-season first half with Cardenales de Lara in Liga Venezuela Beisbol Professional. He finished the half 1-1, 1.71 ERA, 21 IP, .76 WHIP and 9 saves. Kelly again pitched for Cardenales de Lara in 2018 winter season and on November 20, 2018, converted his 19th consecutive save, a club record.

On March 28, 2018, Kelly signed with the Somerset Patriots of the Atlantic League of Professional Baseball. On July 14, 2018 Kelly earned his 100th professional career save with 3 Ks in the 9th to preserve the 3-1 Patriots win. He became a free agent following the 2018 season. On April 3, 2019, Kelly signed with the Toros de Tijuana of the Mexican League. He was traded to the Pericos de Puebla on May 14, 2019. On May 15, 2019, Kelly signed with the Pericos de Puebla of the Mexican League. He was released on June 13, 2019. On June 22, 2019, Kelly signed with the High Point Rockers of the Atlantic League of Professional Baseball. He finished the regular season with 13 saves with 24 Ks in 24 IP. In this, their inaugural season, the Rockers made the 2019 ALPB playoffs via wild card. He became a free agent following the season.

In the off-season 2019, Kelly signed with The Tomateros de Culiacán in the Mexican Pacific League based in Culiacán, Sinaloa. The Tomateros won the 2019-20 Mexican Pacific League title and went on to the Caribbean World Series. On November 22, 2019, Kelly signed with the Acereros de Monclova of the Mexican League. Kelly did not play in a game in 2020 due to the cancellation of the Mexican League season because of the COVID-19 pandemic. He later became a free agent.

References

External links

CPBL

1987 births
Living people
American expatriate baseball players in Mexico
American expatriate baseball players in Taiwan
Arkansas Travelers players
Atlanta Braves players
Baseball players at the 2015 Pan American Games
Baseball players from South Carolina
Cardenales de Lara players
American expatriate baseball players in Venezuela
Eugene Emeralds players
Gulf Coast Pirates players
Gwinnett Braves players
High Point Rockers players
Lynchburg Hillcats players
Major League Baseball pitchers
Mexican League baseball pitchers
Mississippi Braves players
Myrtle Beach Pelicans players
People from Hilton Head, South Carolina
Pericos de Puebla players
San Antonio Missions players
Senadores de San Juan players
Somerset Patriots players
State College Spikes players
Surprise Saguaros players
Tacoma Rainiers players
Tomateros de Culiacán players
Toros de Tijuana players
Tucson Padres players
Uni-President 7-Eleven Lions players
Vaqueros Laguna players
Walters State Senators baseball players
Walters State Community College alumni
West Virginia Power players
Yaquis de Obregón players
Pan American Games competitors for the United States